R374 road may refer to:
 R374 road (Ireland)
 R374 road (South Africa)